Mitch Gore is an American politician and law enforcement officer serving as a member of the Indiana House of Representatives from the 89th district. He assumed office on November 4, 2020.

Early life and education 
Gore was born in Indianapolis. He earned a bachelor's degree from the University of Indianapolis.

Career 
Gore serves as a captain with the Marion County, Indiana Sheriff's Office, where he oversees community development projects. He was elected to the Indiana House of Representatives in November 2020. Gore defeated Republican incumbent Cindy Kirchhofer. Gore was challenged by Republican Indianapolis City-County Councillor Michael-Paul Hart. Gore defeated Hart in the 2022 General Election.

References 

Living people
People from Indianapolis
Politicians from Indianapolis
University of Indianapolis alumni
People from Marion County, Indiana
Democratic Party members of the Indiana House of Representatives
Year of birth missing (living people)